This is a list of the Cabinets of the government of Northern Cyprus since 26 August 1974, the establishment of the Autonomous Turkish Cypriot Administration.

From August 26, 1974 to November 15, 1983

Cabinets of the Turkish Republic of Northern Cyprus

Notes

References

See also
 List of presidents of Northern Cyprus
 List of prime ministers of Northern Cyprus

Northern Cyprus
Politics of Northern Cyprus
Northern Cyprus